"The Hamptons" is the 85th episode of the NBC sitcom Seinfeld. This is the 21st episode for the fifth season. It aired on May 12, 1994. This was the final produced episode of the fifth season, although it aired as the penultimate episode of the season. The episode follows the main characters' misadventures during a weekend visiting friends in the Hamptons: everyone but George sees George's girlfriend topless on the beach, Elaine is puzzled by a man's use of the word "breathtaking", Kramer steals lobsters from a commercial fishing trap, and George is a victim of "shrinkage" when Jerry's girlfriend sees him changing after he came out of the pool.

Plot
The four principal characters travel to the Hamptons to see a baby; they are joined by George's girlfriend Jane, and Rachel, whose father is allowing her to see Jerry again after Jerry gave him kishka to atone for his behavior in The Raincoats. George is excited about Jane coming along, thinking she intends to have sex with him for the first time. At the beach, Jane goes topless in front of Jerry, Kramer, and Elaine while George is out to get tomatoes. Elaine is thrilled to be described as "breathtaking" by the baby's doctor, Ben, until he uses the same adjective to describe the baby, whom Elaine thinks is ugly.

Kramer returns from a beach expedition with enough lobster for everyone and tells George they saw Jane topless. George is infuriated at Jerry about this, and demands to see Rachel naked in recompense. After being warned by Elaine that Rachel is changing, George barges into her room, but Rachel has only dropped her pants. After George excuses himself, Rachel, following incorrect directions to the baby's room, accidentally barges in on him undressing and laughs at the size of his penis. George tries in vain to convince Jerry to explain to her that, having just gotten out of the pool, he is a victim of penile "shrinkage". At dinner Rachel declines to eat the lobster, since it is not kosher. Kramer reveals he got the lobster from a commercial lobster trap. This outrages their host Michael, whose father was a commercial fisherman.

Elaine asks Ben in private about his use of the word "breathtaking". He answers that "sometimes you say a thing like that just to be nice", leaving Elaine more confused about his intentions than ever. Rachel tells Jane about George's penis size, prompting Jane to drive back to New York in the middle of the night. At breakfast, George gets revenge on Rachel by serving scrambled eggs made with lobster. He goes after her with the excuse that he intends to apologize, and this time successfully sees her naked. Police investigate the lobster poaching, and Michael fingers Kramer. Unable to pay the $1,000 fine, he must pick up garbage on the side of the road as a means of community service. On the way home, Jerry, George, and Elaine stop at a tomato stall, where Rachel throws a tomato at George.

Influence on popular culture
The episode has been credited with giving "new meaning to the word 'shrinkage'". Seinfeld writer Peter Mehlman took credit for introducing the word, with apparently enthusiastic approval from Larry David (inversely, Mehlman gave David credit for "sponge-worthy", the catchword from "The Sponge"). The word was later used in a Budweiser commercial and cited as a testament to the show's influence.

References

External links 
 

Seinfeld (season 5) episodes
1994 American television episodes
Television episodes about vacationing